Sabri Kalkandelen (1862, Kalkandelen, Ottoman Empire – 8 April 1943, Istanbul, Turkey) was a poet and chief of the Istanbul Imperial Library.

Sabri Kalkandelen was the son of Mustafa Ruhi Efendi and Saide Hanko and had three sisters: Zehra, Hürrem, and Fatma Hanko, the mother of General Hayrullah Fişek. Kalkandelen married Saime and had two children.

References

People from Tetovo
1862 births
1943 deaths
Turkish librarians
Turkish poets
Curators from Istanbul